Siberia: How the East Was Won is a 2004 documentary film that aired on The History Channel. It attempts to describe Russia's eastward expansion, beginning with the Cossack invasions some five centuries ago. The film was produced using the English language.

Aspects of the documentary
A look at a vast and misunderstood land
Exploration of the northern forests of Asia;
Footage of traveling on the Trans-Siberian Railway;
Comparison of Russia's eastward expansion with the westward expansion of the United States during the nineteenth century;
Discusses pivotal events in the history of Siberia;
Examines the effects on Siberia of the fall of Communism at the end of the twentieth century;
Breathtaking photography of the area's natural beauty;
Interviews with historians and scholars;
Interviews with residents of Siberia.

A DVD containing the documentary was released in 2004. Its run time is 100 minutes.

A&E Television issued a version of the documentary in 2008; its run time is 94 minutes.

References

External links

2000s English-language films
American documentary television films
Documentary films about Russia